Archbishop Próspero María Alarcón y Sánchez de la Barquera  (1827–1908) was a Mexican prelate of the Catholic Church.  As bishop of Mexico City, he was a leader of the Mexican Church and was inspired by Pope Leo XIII's Rerum Novarum.  He viewed the entrance of the Knights of Columbus into Mexico as evidence of the revival of lay Catholicism in Mexico. Alarcon was a native of Mexico.

References
Catholic Hierarchy listing for Alarcon

1828 births
Place of birth missing
1908 deaths
Place of death missing
19th-century Roman Catholic archbishops in Mexico